Giuliana Jakobeit (née Wendt; born October 1, 1976) is a German voice actress.
With the support of her aunt she was able to launch her career. In Germany, she is best known for her role as Jennifer Lopez in Monster-in-Law and as Keira Knightley in Pirates of the Caribbean: The Curse of the Black Pearl.

List of her most famous roles

2002-present: Detective Conan as Ran Mori
2003-2007: Pirates of the Caribbean for Keira Knightley as Elizabeth Swann  
2003-2009: One Tree Hill for Hilarie Burton as Peyton Sawyer
2005: Monster-in-Law for Jennifer Lopez as Charlie  
2007: The Hitcher (2007 film) for Sophia Bush as Grace Andrews
2007: Disney Princess Enchanted Tales: Follow Your Dreams as Princess Aurora
2009: The Vampire Diaries for Kayla Ewell as Vicki Donovan2010-present: My Little Pony: Friendship is Magic as Rainbow Dash2013: My Little Pony: Equestria Girls as Rainbow Dash''
2018: Ralph Breaks the Internet as Jasmine (Disney character)

References

1976 births
German voice actresses
Actresses from Berlin
Living people